Bogdan Viorel Cotolan (born 4 November 1981 in Targoviste, Romania) is a Romanian football player. Cotolan made his professional debut with Gloria Buzău in the Romanian second league.  During the winter of 2005–06 he was tested by CFR Cluj, eventually signing a contract. Cotolan is a right defender and right midfielder, although he can also play on the left side of the pitch.

Below are Bogdan Cotolan's career statistics:

2002–2003 Gloria Buzău 2B / 15 games

2003–2004 Gloria Buzău 13B / 25 games / 3 goals

2004–2005 Gloria Buzău 9B / 21 games / 1 goal

2005–2006 Gloria Buzău 9B / 14 games / 2 goals

2005–2006 CFR Cluj 5A / 9 games

2006–2007 CFR Cluj A / 3 games

2007-     FC Vaslui

External links

Cotolan career stats: http://www.romaniansoccer.ro/players/c/cotolan_bogdan.shtml

Sportspeople from Târgoviște
Romanian footballers
FC Vaslui players
FC Gloria Buzău players
CFR Cluj players
Living people
1981 births
Association football defenders